West China City Daily (WCCD) is a daily newspaper based in Chengdu, China. It was launched on 1 January 1995 and is the first metropolis newspaper in the People's Republic of China.

The preparatory work for the establishment of West China City Daily began in early 1994, and the publication was officially launched on New Year's Day in 1995. It was established by the Sichuan Daily Newspaper Industry Group (四川日报报业集团) and is published by the West China City Daily Agency (华西都市报社).

It is also referred as West China Metropolis Daily in some English translations.

References

1995 establishments in China
Chinese-language newspapers (Simplified Chinese)
Daily newspapers published in China
Mass media in Chengdu
Newspapers established in 1995